Ian Thorogood (25 August 1936 – 19 March 2019) was an Australian rules footballer who played and coached in the Victorian Football League (VFL).

Biography 
Thorogood played for Melbourne, including three premiership teams. In 1963, he went to the Waverley Football Club in the Victorian Football Association, and he coached the club to its sole Division 1 premiership in 1965. He was also responsible for giving the club its nickname, the Panthers. He moved on to become assistant coach of South Melbourne in 1970.

He joined the Carlton Football Club as assistant coach in 1976, but took over the senior coaching position when John Nicholls resigned at the beginning of the season. He coached the club for the 1976 and 1977 seasons.

Thorogood died at age 82 on 19 March 2019.

References

External links
 
 Profile at Blueseum
 Profile at Demonwiki

Carlton Football Club coaches
Melbourne Football Club players
1936 births
2019 deaths
Australian rules footballers from Victoria (Australia)
Waverley Football Club players
Melbourne Football Club Premiership players
Three-time VFL/AFL Premiership players